The 1902 Grand National was the 64th renewal of the Grand National horse race that took place at Aintree near Liverpool, England, on 21 March 1902.

Finishing Order

Non-finishers

References

 1902
Grand National
Grand National
20th century in Lancashire